The Church of St. Mina or Štava church is a 17th-century Serbian Orthodox Church situated in the village of Štava, 5,5 km south from Lukovska Banja, Toplica District, Serbia. It was built between 1614 and 1647.

References

Serbian Orthodox church buildings in Serbia
Churches completed in 1647
17th-century Serbian Orthodox church buildings
1647 establishments in the Ottoman Empire